Cheilosporum cultratum is a species of red algae in the family Corallinaceae.

References

External links
 
 Cheilosporum cultratum at algaebase.org

Corallinaceae
Species described in 1852